The snail-eating thirst snake or short-faced snail-eater (Dipsas brevifacies) is a non-venomous snake found in Mexico, Belize and Guatemala.

References

Dipsas
Snakes of North America
Reptiles of Mexico
Reptiles of Belize
Reptiles of Guatemala
Reptiles described in 1866
Taxa named by Edward Drinker Cope